is a Japanese animation studio based in Koganei, Tokyo. It has a strong presence in the animation industry and has expanded its portfolio to include various media formats, such as short subjects, television commercials, and two television films. Their work has been well-received by audiences and has even been recognized with awards. Its mascot and most recognizable symbol is a character named Totoro, a giant spirit inspired by raccoon dogs (tanuki) and cats from the 1988 anime film My Neighbor Totoro. Among the studio's highest-grossing films are Spirited Away (2001), Howl's Moving Castle (2004), and Ponyo (2008). The studio was founded on June 15, 1985, by the directors Hayao Miyazaki and Isao Takahata and producer Toshio Suzuki, after acquiring Topcraft's assets. It has also collaborated with video game studios on the visual development of several games.

Five of the studio's films are among the ten highest-grossing anime feature films made in Japan. Spirited Away is second, grossing 31.68 billion yen in Japan and over US$380 million worldwide; and Princess Mononoke is fourth, grossing 20.18 billion yen. Many of their works have won the Animage Grand Prix award. Four have won the Japan Academy Prize for Animation of the Year. Five of their films have received Academy Award nominations. Spirited Away won the 2002 Golden Bear and the 2003 Academy Award for Best Animated Feature.

On August 3, 2014, Studio Ghibli temporarily suspended production following Miyazaki's retirement. In February 2017, Suzuki announced that Miyazaki had come out of retirement to direct a new feature film, How Do You Live? (2023), which he intends to be his last film.

Name

The name "Ghibli" was chosen by Miyazaki from the Italian noun  (also used in English), based on the Libyan Arabic name for hot desert wind, the idea being that the studio would "blow a new wind through the anime industry". It also refers to an Italian aircraft, the Caproni Ca.309. Although the Italian word would be more accurately transliterated as "Giburi", with a hard g sound, the studio is romanised in Japanese as Jiburi.

History

Tokuma Shoten era

Founded on June 15, 1985, Studio Ghibli was headed by directors Hayao Miyazaki and Isao Takahata and producer Toshio Suzuki. Miyazaki and Takahata had already had long careers in Japanese film and television animation and had worked together on The Great Adventure of Horus, Prince of the Sun in 1968 and the Panda! Go, Panda! films in 1972 and 1973. In 1978, Suzuki became an editor at Tokuma Shoten's Animage manga magazine, where the first film he chose was Horus. A year after his phone call with Takahata and his first encounter with Miyazaki, both about Horus, he made a phone call about the first film Miyazaki ever directed: The Castle of Cagliostro.

The studio was founded after the success of the 1984 film Nausicaä of the Valley of the Wind. Suzuki was part of the film's production team, and founded Studio Ghibli with Miyazaki, who also invited Takahata to join them.

The studio has mainly produced films by Miyazaki, with the second most prolific director being Takahata (most notably with Grave of the Fireflies). Other directors who have worked with Studio Ghibli include Yoshifumi Kondō, Hiroyuki Morita, Gorō Miyazaki, and Hiromasa Yonebayashi. Composer Joe Hisaishi has provided the soundtracks for most of Miyazaki's Studio Ghibli films. In their book Anime Classics Zettai!, Brian Camp and Julie Davis made note of Michiyo Yasuda as "a mainstay of Studio Ghibli's extraordinary design and production team". At one time the studio was based in Kichijōji, Musashino, Tokyo.

In August 1996, The Walt Disney Company and Tokuma Shoten formed a partnership wherein Walt Disney Studios would be the sole international distributor for Tokuma Shoten's Studio Ghibli animated films. Under this agreement, Disney also agreed to finance 10% of the studio's production costs. Since then, all three of the aforementioned films by Miyazaki at Studio Ghibli that were previously dubbed by Streamline Pictures have been re-dubbed by Disney. On June 1, 1997, Tokuma Shoten Publishing consolidated its media operations by merging Studio Ghibli, Tokuma Shoten Intermedia software and Tokuma International under one location.

Over the years, there has been a close relationship between Studio Ghibli and the magazine Animage, which regularly runs exclusive articles on the studio and its members in a section titled "Ghibli Notes." Artwork from Ghibli's films and other works are frequently featured on the cover of the magazine. Saeko Himuro's novel Umi ga Kikoeru was serialised in the magazine and subsequently adapted into Ocean Waves, Studio Ghibli's first animated feature-length film created for television. It was directed by Tomomi Mochizuki.

In October 2001, the Ghibli Museum opened in Mitaka, Tokyo. It contains exhibits based on Studio Ghibli films and shows animations, including a number of short Studio Ghibli films not available elsewhere.

The studio is also known for its strict "no-edits" policy in licensing their films abroad due to Nausicaä of the Valley of the Wind being heavily edited for the film's release in the United States as Warriors of the Wind. The "no cuts" policy was highlighted when Miramax co-chairman Harvey Weinstein suggested editing Princess Mononoke to make it more marketable. A Studio Ghibli producer is rumored to have sent an authentic Japanese sword with a simple message: "No cut.".

Independent era
Between 1999 and 2005, Studio Ghibli was a subsidiary brand of Tokuma Shoten; however, that partnership ended in April 2005, when Studio Ghibli was spun off from Tokuma Shoten and was re-established as an independent company with relocated headquarters.

On February 1, 2008, Toshio Suzuki stepped down from the position of Studio Ghibli president, which he had held since 2005, and Koji Hoshino (former president of Walt Disney Japan) took over. Suzuki said he wanted to improve films with his own hands as a producer, rather than demanding this from his employees. Suzuki decided to hand over the presidency to Hoshino because Hoshino has helped Studio Ghibli to sell its videos since 1996 and has also aided the release of the Princess Mononoke film in the United States. Suzuki still serves on the company's board of directors.

Two Studio Ghibli short films created for the Ghibli Museum were shown at the Carnegie Hall Citywise Japan NYC Festival: "House Hunting" and "Mon Mon the Water Spider" were screened on March 26, 2011.

Takahata developed a project for release after Gorō Miyazaki's (director of Tales from Earthsea and Hayao's son) The Tale of the Princess Kaguya – an adaptation of The Tale of the Bamboo Cutter. The last film Hayao Miyazaki directed before retiring from feature films was The Wind Rises which is about the Mitsubishi A6M Zero and its creator.

On Sunday, September 1, 2013, Hayao Miyazaki held a press conference in Venice to confirm his retirement, saying: "I know I've said I would retire many times in the past. Many of you must think, 'Once again.' But this time I am quite serious."

In 2013, a documentary directed by Mami Sunada called  was created delving into the lives of those working at Studio Ghibli and the productions of the animated films The Wind Rises and The Tale of the Princess Kaguya, including storyboard sketching, inking, painting, and voice actor selection for the films.

On January 31, 2014, it was announced that Gorō Miyazaki will direct his first anime television series, Sanzoku no Musume Rōnya, an adaptation of Astrid Lindgren's Ronia the Robber's Daughter for NHK. The series is computer-animated, produced by Polygon Pictures, and co-produced by Studio Ghibli.

In March 2014, Toshio Suzuki retired as producer and assumed the new position of general manager. Yoshiaki Nishimura replaced Suzuki in the producer role.

On August 3, 2014, Toshio Suzuki announced that Studio Ghibli would take a "brief pause" to re-evaluate and restructure in the wake of Miyazaki's retirement. He stated some concerns about where the company would go in the future. This led to speculation that Studio Ghibli will never produce another feature film again. On November 7, 2014, Miyazaki stated, "That was not my intention, though. All I did was announce that I would be retiring and not making any more features." Lead producer Yoshiaki Nishimura among several other staffers from Ghibli, such as director Hiromasa Yonebayashi, left to found Studio Ponoc in April 2015, working on the film Mary and the Witch's Flower.

The 2016 animated fantasy film The Red Turtle, directed and co-written by Dutch-British animator Michaël Dudok de Wit in his feature film debut, was a co-production between Studio Ghibli and Wild Bunch.

In February 2017, Toshio Suzuki announced that Hayao Miyazaki had come out of retirement to direct a new feature film with Studio Ghibli.

On November 28, 2017, Koji Hoshino stepped down as president; he was replaced by Kiyofumi Nakajima (former Ghibli Museum director). Hoshino was then appointed as Chairman of Studio Ghibli.

In May 2020, Toshio Suzuki confirmed that a new film from Gorō Miyazaki is in development at Studio Ghibli. On June 3, 2020, Studio Ghibli announced that the film would be an adaptation of the novel Earwig and the Witch by Diana Wynne Jones. The film was announced as the first full 3D CG animated Ghibli film and slated for a television premiere on NHK in late 2020.

On November 1, 2022, the Studio Ghibli themed amusement park Ghibli Park opened.

Distribution rights

Theatrical and home media rights

Japan
In Japan, the company's films (along with The Castle of Cagliostro and all other Lupin the Third titles for movie theaters as well as Mary and the Witch's Flower) are distributed by Toho theatrically, except for Castle in the Sky, Kiki's Delivery Service (which were distributed by Toei Company along with Nausicaä of the Valley of the Wind, with Toei producing The Great Adventure of Horus, Prince of the Sun), and My Neighbors the Yamadas, which was distributed by Shochiku.

For home media, a majority of Studio Ghibli releases are distributed by Walt Disney Studios Japan. This also includes Nausicaä of the Valley of the Wind, The Castle of Cagliostro and Mary and the Witch's Flower. Pony Canyon occasionally releases Ghibli documentaries on home media, and also distributes rental versions of Ghibli's movies under a deal with Disney. Pony Canyon also fully distributed the standalone version of Earwig and the Witch on home media.

Before the Disney deal, Tokuma Shoten released Ghibli movies themselves through their "Animage Video" imprint, as well as all Laserdisc releases of the movies, as the Disney deal did not include that format.

North America
Manson International and Showmen, Inc. produced a 95-minute English dub of Nausicaä of the Valley of the Wind, titled Warriors of the Wind, which was released theatrically in the United States by New World Pictures on June 13, 1985, followed by a VHS release in December 1985. In the late 1980s, Vestron Video would re-release the film and First Independent Video would re-release it again in 1993, with another minute cut from the film. The voice actors and actresses were not credited and were not even informed of the film's plot line, and the film was heavily edited to market it as a children's action-adventure film, although the film received a PG rating just like Disney's later English dub. Due to the heavy editing of the film in an attempt to appeal to American audiences, much of Nausicaä was cut out, including much of the environmentalist themes, which were diluted. The main subplot of the Ohmu was similarly altered to arguably portray them as aggressive. Most of the characters' names were changed, including the titular character who became Princess Zandra. The United States poster and VHS cover featured a cadre of male characters who are not in the film, riding the resurrected God Warrior—including a still-living Warrior shown briefly in a flashback. Overall, approximately 22 minutes was cut for North American release. Warriors of the Wind also prompted Miyazaki to allow translator Toren Smith of Studio Proteus to create an official, faithful translation of the Nausicaä manga for Viz Media.

In the late 1980s, an English dub of Castle in the Sky was produced by Magnum Video Tape and Dubbing for international Japan Airlines flights at the request of Tokuma Shoten. The Castle dub was briefly screened in the United States by Streamline Pictures. Carl Macek, the head of Streamline, was disappointed with this dub, deeming it "adequate, but clumsy". Following this, Tokuma allowed Streamline to dub their future acquisitions My Neighbor Totoro and Kiki's Delivery Service. In April 1993, Troma Films, under their 50th St. Films banner, distributed the Totoro dub as a theatrical release, and the dub was later released onto VHS and eventually onto DVD by 20th Century Fox Home Entertainment. In the early 1990s, an English dub of Porco Rosso was produced by an unknown company, again for international Japan Airlines flights. The original dubs can be seen on the 1996 Ghibli ga Ippai Laserdisc set, and on the initial copies for the Japanese DVD releases of Totoro, Laputa and Porco.

In 1996, Walt Disney Studios acquired worldwide distribution rights to the Studio Ghibli library, with Disney redubbing all previously dubbed films. In addition, Walt Disney Studios Japan agreed to contribute 10% of the funding for all future releases, starting with My Neighbors the Yamadas, in exchange for right of first refusal regarding international distribution. Disney continues with this practice to this day, even extending it to the works of Studio Ponoc and to co-productions like The Red Turtle in Japan. It was said to have taken four years for Disney and Studio Ghibli to reach a distribution deal. Originally, the Ghibli films were meant to headline a line of videos called Animation Celebration, highlighting critically acclaimed animated films from around the world. These plans never materialized in full, but the Animation Celebration logo can be seen on Disney's original VHS release of Kiki's Delivery Service. During Disney's tenure, the studio produced the English dubs and released 15 of Ghibli's films, plus Nausicaä of the Valley of the Wind, through the Walt Disney Pictures, Buena Vista Home Video, Miramax and Touchstone Pictures banners.

Disney and Ghibli have also selectively chosen not to promote and record an English-dubbed version for films and works deemed less internationally marketable, including some of Takahata's more developmental and obscure pieces. Although the Studio has a "No cuts" policy in terms of international versions and dubs, this does not apply to promotional posters, etc., for which the film makers collaborate with Disney to produce cultural appropriate international versions. The Studio has not shied away from slight rebranding on the international stage in order to convey slightly tweaked promotional imagery for different cultural norms. One example of these slight tweaks to international promotional materials can be seen between the Japanese and English versions of the movie poster for Spirited Away (2001). For American and other English-speaking audiences, the name of the film was changed from the Japanese version, which directly translates roughly to, "The Disappearance of Chihiro and Sen", to Spirited Away to suggest more mystical, otherworldly themes, since the direct Japanese translation could be taken to mean that Chihiro/Sen disappeared due to some more dangerous reason. On the American movie poster, more pictures of spirits from the film were added to the background to further pique the viewer's interest with more supernatural themes, creating an association between the pictures spirits and what most American people would think of as "ghosts". For the Japanese poster, there are fewer spirits as the Japanese Shinto religion normalizes the existence of spirits, so less emphasis is needed to convey the importance of non-human spirits. Also, Disney enlarged the "Studio Ghibli" and "Hayao Miyazaki" labels on the poster, helping to bring greater awareness to the studio through the success of Spirited Away.

In 2011, GKIDS acquired the North American theatrical distribution rights of the aforementioned Ghibli films, with Walt Disney Studios Home Entertainment retaining the home video rights. Afterwards, in 2013, GKIDS acquired the US and Canadian distribution rights to From Up on Poppy Hill. The film, which Disney passed on to GKIDS due to dealing with potential incest, marked the first time since 1996 that Disney handed a Studio Ghibli film off to another distributor. Afterwards, GKIDS would go on to distribute the films Disney found to be too mature or unmarketable for American audiences: Only Yesterday, Ocean Waves, The Tale of the Princess Kaguya and When Marnie Was There. Finally, in July 2017, Disney relinquished its home video rights (with the exception of The Wind Rises, which remained with Disney until 2020 due to a distribution clause) to GKIDS, which handles all theatrical and home media distribution of Ghibli films in North America along with Mary and the Witch's Flower. Nevertheless, Disney still continues to handle select distribution in Japan (home media), Taiwan and China.

GKIDS' home media releases have been handled by multiple distributors. Cinedigm distributed the home media release of Poppy Hill, Universal Pictures Home Entertainment distributed the home media releases of Kaguya, Marnie, Mary, Yesterday and Waves, and Shout! Factory all subsequent releases thus far. The Ghibli films owned by GKIDS were made available for digital purchases on most major services in the United States and Canada on December 17, 2019, through Shout! Factory.

International
Outside Asia (including Japan) and North America since 2003, Wild Bunch has held international sales rights to Ghibli's film library and serves as a distributor itself in France and Belgium along with home media rights released under the Wild Side Vidéo label (distributed by Warner Bros. Home Entertainment France). The company also sells distribution rights to separate distributors across the world, including StudioCanal UK/Elysian Film Group (United Kingdom and Ireland), Leonine (Germany), Lucky Red (Italy), Vértigo Films (Spain) and Madman Entertainment (Australia and New Zealand).

Notably, The Secret World of Arrietty received a second dub exclusive to the United Kingdom, produced by StudioCanal, likely due to the film's origins being from Mary Norton's British novel The Borrowers.

Disney formerly held the international sales rights as well until Wild Bunch's purchase in 2003. Disney kept the French distribution rights to Ghibli's library until September 2020, when it had expired and transitioned off to Wild Bunch. Since 2021, Warner Bros. Home Entertainment serves as the home media distributor of Studio Ghibli's catalog via its distribution deal with Wild Bunch through the Wild Side Vidéo label.

Streaming rights
Prior to 2019, Studio Ghibli opted not to make its films available digitally, feeling that physical media and theatrical events like GKIDS' Studio Ghibli Fest would work more towards their goal of mindful care and curation for their films. Disney had previously lobbied for a streaming deal with Ghibli during their distribution tenure, but such attempts were never materialized. The studio heads changed their minds after hearing a quote from American actor and director Woody Allen about how there should be multiple outlets for feature films.

On October 17, 2019, WarnerMedia's HBO Max announced it had acquired exclusive streaming rights to Studio Ghibli's catalogue in the United States as part of a deal with GKIDS; these films were available when the service launched in May 2020. On January 20, 2020, it was announced that Netflix acquired the exclusive streaming rights to this catalogue in all regions where it operates except for the United States (in which Netflix does have streaming rights to The Castle of Cagliostro and Mary and the Witch's Flower), as part of a deal with Ghibli's international sales rights partner Wild Bunch. Seven of twenty-one films in the studio's catalogue were released on February 1, 2020, with the others following on March 1 and April 1. Netflix then struck a separate deal with GKIDS for streaming rights in Canada which was announced on June 22, and came into effect on June 25 for most films. Currently, no streaming rights deals have been announced for Studio Ghibli's home country of Japan, nor for markets such as China where neither Netflix nor HBO Max is available.

Grave of the Fireflies
Most of the above deals exclude Grave of the Fireflies; unlike most of the other films, which were published by Tokuma Shoten, Grave of the Fireflies was produced and is owned by Shinchosha, which also had published the short story it was based on, and as such, fell into different rights holdings.

Grave of the Fireflies was released in Japan on VHS by Buena Vista Home Entertainment under the Ghibli ga Ippai Collection on August 7, 1998. On July 29, 2005, a DVD release was distributed through Warner Home Video. Walt Disney Studios Japan released the complete collector's edition DVD on August 6, 2008. WDSJ released the film on Blu-ray twice on July 18, 2012: one as a single release, and one in a two-film set with My Neighbor Totoro.

It was released on VHS in North America by Central Park Media in a subtitled form on June 2, 1993. They later released the film with an English dub on VHS on September 1, 1998 (the same day Disney released Kiki's Delivery Service in North America) and an all-Regions DVD (which also included the original Japanese with English subtitles) on October 7 the same year. It was later released on a two-disc DVD set (which once again included both the English dub and the original Japanese with English subtitles as well as the film's storyboards with the second disc containing more extensive Bonus Features) on October 8, 2002. It was released by Central Park Media one last time on December 7, 2004. Following the May 2009 bankruptcy and liquidation of Central Park Media, ADV Films acquired the rights and re-released it on DVD on July 7, 2009. Following the September 1, 2009 shutdown and re-branding of ADV, their successor, Sentai Filmworks, rescued the film and released a remastered DVD on March 6, 2012. A Blu-ray edition was released on November 20, 2012, featuring an all-new English dub produced by Seraphim Digital, along with a digital release that same year.

StudioCanal released a Blu-ray in the United Kingdom on July 1, 2013. Madman Entertainment released the film in Australia and New Zealand.

Works

While not technically Studio Ghibli films, The Great Adventure of Horus, Prince of the Sun (1968), Panda! Go Panda! (1972), The Castle of Cagliostro (1979), Jarinko Chie (1981), Gauche the Cellist (1982), Nausicaä of the Valley of the Wind (1984), The Red Turtle (2016), Mary and the Witch's Flower (2017) and Modest Heroes (2018) are sometimes grouped together with the Studio Ghibli library (particularly with the Ghibli ga Ippai home video collection released by Walt Disney Studios Japan) due to their ties to the studio.

Horus and Cagliostro were the feature-length directorial debuts of Isao Takahata and Hayao Miyazaki respectively, and were produced by Toei Animation and TMS Entertainment years before the founding of Studio Ghibli.

Nausicaä was directed by Miyazaki at Topcraft, a studio which Miyazaki, Takahata and Toshio Suzuki later purchased and renamed Studio Ghibli. As a result, the film has often been rereleased and marketed as a Studio Ghibli movie.

The Red Turtle was a collaborative effort by Studio Ghibli with Dutch animator Michaël Dudok de Wit and was branded as a Studio Ghibli release internationally. It was distributed by Sony Pictures Classics in North and Latin America.

For the purposes of the list below, films that appear in Studio Ghibli's official filmography are listed. Other Studio Ghibli productions are listed here.

Feature films

Television

Style and themes

Studio Ghibli films are mostly hand-drawn using rich water and acrylic colors. The films use traditional methods of making animation where every frame is drawn by hand. Computer animation techniques are used sparingly. Traditional animation is slower than modern techniques. The more frames a film has, the longer it takes to draw. All the Studio Ghibli films use vivid color, and have a "whimsical and joyful aesthetic".

The films often focus on the lives of youth, especially school children. The signature style and recurrent themes of the studio reflect those of Miyazaki and the other directors and creatives. Common themes include the risks posed by progress to tradition, environmentalism and the natural world, independent female protagonists, the cost of war, and youth.

Notable animators and character designers
 Masashi Ando (Paranoia Agent and Paprika)
 Makiko Futaki (Akira, Angel's Egg)
 Katsuya Kondō (Kiki's Delivery Service, Howl's Moving Castle)
 Kitarō Kōsaka (Monster, Master Keaton, and Nasu)
 Kazuo Oga (The Night of Taneyamagahara, My Neighbor Totoro)
 Kenichi Yoshida (Overman King Gainer and Eureka Seven)
 Akihiko Yamashita (Tide-Line Blue, Princess Nine, Strange Dawn, and Relic Armor Legacium)
 Hideaki Anno (Nausicaä of the Valley of the Wind, Neon Genesis Evangelion)
 Takashi Nakamura (Nausicaä of the Valley of the Wind, Akira, Robot Carnival and Catnapped!)
 Atsushi Takahashi (Spirited Away)
 Takashi Watanabe (Nausicaä of the Valley of the Wind, Slayers, Boogiepop Phantom and Shakugan no Shana)

See also

 Ghibli Museum in Mitaka, Tokyo
 Studio Kajino, a subsidiary of Studio Ghibli
 Yasuo Ōtsuka
 Studio Ponoc, founded by former members of Studio Ghibli
 List of Japanese animation studios

Notes

References

Further reading
 Alpert, Steve. Sharing a House with the Never-Ending Man: 15 Years at Studio Ghibli. Berkeley: Stone Bridge Press, 2020. . 
 Cavallaro, Dani. The Animé Art of Hayao Miyazaki. Jefferson, NC: McFarland & Company, 2006. . .
 McCarthy, Helen. Hayao Miyazaki: Master of Japanese Animation: Films, Themes, Artistry. Berkeley, Calif.: Stone Bridge Press, 1999. . . 2001 reprint of the 1999 text, with revisions: .
 Miyazaki, Hayao. Starting Point: 1979–1996. Beth Cary and Frederik L. Schodt, trans. San Francisco: VIZ Media, 2009. . .
 Miyazaki, Hayao. . Tokyo: Studio Ghibli/Hatsubai Tokuma Shoten, 1996. . . Original Japanese edition.
 Miyazaki, Hayao. Turning Point: 1997–2008. Beth Cary and Frederik L. Schodt, trans. San Francisco: VIZ Media, 2014. . .
 Miyazaki, Hayao. . Tokyo: Iwanami Shoten, 2008. . . Original Japanese edition.
 Napier, Susan. Miyazakiworld: A Life in Art. New Haven, CT: Yalue University Press, 2019. . 
 Odell, Colin, and Michelle Le Blanc. Studio Ghibli: The Films of Hayao Miyazaki and Isao Takahata. Harpenden, Hertfordshire, England: Kamera, 2009. . .
 Suzuki, Toshio. Mixing Work with Pleasure: My Life at Studio Ghibli. Tokyo: Japan Publishing Industry Foundation for Culture, 2018. . 

Documentaries
 . 1998 documentary, Nippon TV, 28 min.
 . 2013 documentary by Mami Sunada, 118 min.
 . 2016 documentary by Kaku Arakawa, 70 min.

External links

 
  
 

 
Japanese companies established in 1985
Animation studios in Tokyo
Film production companies of Japan
Japanese animation studios
Koganei, Tokyo
Mass media companies established in 1985
Topcraft
Western Tokyo